Antonio Russo (born 1 February 2000) is an Italian football player. He plays for Real Agro Aversa.

Club career
He made his senior debut in the 2017–18 season for Serie D club Sarnese. In the summer of 2018, he joined Salernitana and was assigned to their Under-19 squad.

For the 2019–20 season, he was loaned to Marsala in Serie D.

On 7 October 2020, he joined Serie C side Bisceglie on loan. He made his professional debut for Bisceglie on 18 October 2020 in a game against Palermo. He finished the loan with 18 league appearances after losing his starting spot to Andrea Spurio in February 2021.

On 19 July 2022, Russo moved to Taranto. Having departed the club in October, he joined Real Agro Aversa in November 2022.

References

External links
 

2000 births
People from Acerra
Sportspeople from the Province of Naples
Living people
Italian footballers
Association football goalkeepers
U.S. Salernitana 1919 players
S.S.D. Marsala Calcio players
A.S. Bisceglie Calcio 1913 players
Taranto F.C. 1927 players
A.S.D. Real Agro Aversa players
Serie C players
Serie D players
Footballers from Campania